The 1979–80 Tennessee Volunteers basketball team represented the University of Tennessee as a member of the Southeastern Conference during the 1979–80 college basketball season. Led by second-year head coach Don DeVoe, the team played their home games at the Stokely Athletic Center in Knoxville, Tennessee. The Volunteers finished with a record of 18–11 (12–6 SEC, T-3rd) and received an at-large bid to the 1980 NCAA tournament as the 7 seed in the East region. After an opening round win over No. 10 seed Furman, Tennessee was defeated by No. 2 seed Maryland, 86–75.

This was the second of five straight seasons of NCAA Tournament basketball for the Tennessee men's program.

Roster

Schedule and results

|-
!colspan=9 style=| Regular season

|-
!colspan=9 style=| SEC tournament

|-
!colspan=9 style=| NCAA tournament

Rankings

NBA Draft

References

Tennessee Volunteers basketball seasons
Tennessee
Tennessee
Volunteers
Volunteers